Isle is Flow's fourth studio album. The album comes in two editions: regular and limited. The limited edition comes with a bonus DVD. It reached #7 on the Oricon charts  and charted for 12 weeks.

Track listing

Bonus DVD Track listing

References

Flow (band) albums
2008 albums